The Tower is a 1984 album by The Legendary Pink Dots.  It was the last album which April White (credited as April Iliffe/Sybil Strange-Cargo) appeared on.

Track listing

Personnel
Che Banana (Edward Ka-Spel) - vocals, keyboards, electronics
Phil Harmonix (Phil Knight) - keyboards, electronics, percussion
Stret Majest Alarme (Barry Gray) - guitars
Sybil Strange-Cargo (April Iliffe) - keyboards, vocals
Patrick Paganini Q (Patrick Wright) - violin, keyboards
Roland Calloway - bass

Additional personnel
Lilly AK (Astrid) - vocals (on track 8)
Armin Bliss
Pat Bermingham – engineer

Notes
The initial release by In Phaze was limited to 2,500 copies. The Terminal Kaleidoscope/PIAS editions contain a different cover, while the Soleilmoon editions feature new artwork.

References

1984 albums
The Legendary Pink Dots albums